Te Rangi-i-paia II  (fl. 1818–1829) was a notable New Zealand tribal leader. Of Māori descent, she identified with the Ngāti Porou iwi. She was born in Tokomaru Bay, East Coast, New Zealand in and active from about 1818.

References

Year of birth missing
1829 deaths
Ngāti Porou people
People from Tokomaru Bay
19th-century women rulers